"Get Away" is the third single from Mobb Deep's Infamy album.  The song is produced by Ez Elpee & the music video is directed by Diane Martel.  This b-side features the song "Hey Luv (Anything)", the group's previous single, featuring 112.

Track listing
Side A
"Get Away" [Clean Version]
"Get Away" [Dirty Version]
"Get Away" [Instrumental]

Side B
"Hey Luv (Anything)" [Clean Version]
"Hey Luv (Anything)" [Dirty Version]
"Hey Luv (Anything)" [Instrumental]

Charts

References

2002 singles
Mobb Deep songs
2001 songs
Loud Records singles
Songs written by Prodigy (rapper)
Songs written by Havoc (musician)